Neponset is a village in Bureau County, Illinois, United States. The population was 427 at the 2020 census. It is part of the Ottawa Micropolitan Statistical Area.

Geography

Demographics

As of the 2020 census there were 427 people, 149 households, and 100 families residing in the village. The racial makeup of the village was 87.35% White, 1.41% African American, 0.23% Native American, 0.94% Asian, 3.98% from other races, and 6.09% from two or more races. Hispanic or Latino of any race were 6.79% of the population.

There were 149 households, out of which 60.40% had children under the age of 18 living with them, 51.01% were married couples living together, 4.70% had a female householder with no husband present, and 32.89% were non-families. 24.83% of all households were made up of individuals, and 15.44% had someone living alone who was 65 years of age or older. The average household size was 3.04 and the average family size was 2.56.

The village's age distribution consisted of 24.3% under the age of 18, 6.5% from 18 to 24, 30.1% from 25 to 44, 24.6% from 45 to 64, and 14.4% who were 65 years of age or older. The median age was 36.5 years. For every 100 females, there were 109.9 males. For every 100 females age 18 and over, there were 100.7 males.

The median income for a household in the village was $54,750, and the median income for a family was $75,000. Males had a median income of $43,125 versus $25,833 for females. The per capita income for the village was $24,529. About 9.0% of families and 20.2% of the population were below the poverty line, including 29.0% of those under age 18 and 14.5% of those age 65 or over.

References

Villages in Bureau County, Illinois
Villages in Illinois
Ottawa, IL Micropolitan Statistical Area
1855 establishments in Illinois
Populated places established in 1855